2005 was designated as the International Year for Sport and Physical Education and the International Year of Microcredit. The beginning of 2005 also marked the end of the International Decade of the World's Indigenous People (1995–2005).

Events

January
 January 1 – Jeanna Giese from Wisconsin, United States, comes home from hospital, and officially becomes the first person to ever survive rabies without a vaccination.
 January 5 – Eris, the most massive known dwarf planet in the Solar System, is discovered by a team led by Michael E. Brown using images originally taken on October 21, 2003, at the Palomar Observatory.
 January 12 – Deep Impact is launched from Cape Canaveral with the purpose of studying the comet Tempel 1.
 January 14 – The Huygens spacecraft lands on Titan, the largest moon of Saturn.
 January 20
 George W. Bush is inaugurated for a second term as President of the United States.
 The most intense solar particle event in recorded history is observed.

February
 February 10 – North Korea announces that it possesses nuclear weapons as a protection against the hostility it says it perceives from the United States.
 February 14
 Former Lebanese Prime Minister Rafic Hariri is assassinated, along with 21 others, by a suicide bomber in Beirut.
 YouTube, an American online video sharing and social media platform was launched by Steve Chen, Chad Hurley, and Jawed Karim headquartered in San Bruno, California.
 February 16 – The Kyoto Protocol officially goes into effect.
 February 21 – Avatar: The Last Airbender premiers on Nickelodeon.
 February 22 — blink-182 announces "indefinite hiatus"

March
 March 14 – China ratifies an anti-secession law, aimed at preventing Taiwan from declaring independence.
 March 24 – The President of Kyrgyzstan, Askar Akayev, is deposed following mass anti-government demonstrations and flees the country.
 March 28 – The 8.6  Nias–Simeulue earthquake shakes northern Sumatra with a maximum Mercalli intensity of VI (Strong), leaving 915–1,314 people dead and 340–1,146 injured.

April
 April 2 – Pope John Paul II dies; over four million people travel to the Vatican to mourn him. Pope Benedict XVI succeeds him on April 19, becoming the 265th pope.
 April 8 – The first solar eclipse of the year was a rare hybrid event, occurring at ascending node in Aries. This was 4.4 days after the Moon reached perigee. Gamma had a value of -0.34733. A hybrid solar eclipse was visible from south Pacific, Panama, Colombia and Venezuela, and was the 51st solar eclipse of Solar Saros 129.
 April 9 – Charles, Prince of Wales marries Camilla Parker Bowles in a civil ceremony at Windsor's Guildhall. Camilla receives the title Duchess of Cornwall.
 April 23 – The first ever YouTube video is uploaded, titled Me at the zoo.
 April 24 – The first lunar eclipse of the year was a penumbral event, occurring at descending node in Virgo. This was 5 days before the Moon reached perigee. Gamma had a value of -1.08851. A penumbral lunar eclipse was visible in eastern Asia, Australia, Pacific and Americas, and was the 23rd lunar eclipse of Lunar Saros 141.
 April 26 – Syria withdraws the last of its military garrison from Lebanon, ending its 29-year military occupation of the country.
 April 27 – The Superjumbo jet aircraft Airbus A380 makes its first flight from Toulouse.

May
 May 13 – Uzbek Interior Ministry and National Security Service troops massacre at least 200 protesters in the city of Andijan.
 May 15 – Star Wars: Episode III – Revenge of the Sith premiers in Cinemas.
 May 19–21 – The Eurovision Song Contest 2005 takes place in Kyiv, Ukraine, and is won by Greek entrant Helena Paparizou with the song "My Number One". 
May 21 – Kingda Ka is opened for the first time to the public at Six Flags: Great Adventure, becoming the world's tallest and fastest roller coaster at the time.

June
 June 4 – The Civic Forum of the Romanians of Covasna, Harghita and Mureș is founded.

July
 July 2 – Live 8, a set of 10 simultaneous concerts, takes place throughout the world, raising interest in the Make Poverty History campaign.
 July 6 
The European Parliament rejects the proposed directive on the patentability of computer-implemented inventions in its second reading.
 The International Olympic Committee awards London the right to host the 2012 Summer Olympics. 
 July 7 – Four coordinated suicide bombings hit central London, killing 52 people and injuring over 700.
 July 23 – A series of bombings hit the resort city of Sharm el-Sheikh, Egypt, killing over 80 people.
 July 28 – As a result of the Good Friday Agreement signed in 1998, the Provisional Irish Republican Army ends its armed campaign and decommissions their weapons, by ordering all its units to drop their arms under the supervision of the Independent International Commission on Decommissioning.

August
 August 12 – The Mars Reconnaissance Orbiter is launched from Cape Canaveral, designed to explore Mars.
 August 14 – Helios Airways Flight 522, en route from Larnaca, Cyprus to Prague, Czech Republic via Athens, crashes in the hills near Grammatiko, Greece, killing 121 passengers and crew.
 August 16 – West Caribbean Airways Flight 708 crashes into a mountain in Venezuela, killing 160 passengers and crew.
 August 18 – Peace Mission 2005, the first joint China–Russia military exercise, begins its eight-day training on the Shandong Peninsula.
 August 26 – The Constitution of Chile is heavily amended, eliminating senators for life, reducing the presidential terms from six to four years, giving the president exclusive rights to summon the National Security Council, and removes legal obstacles for the creation of new regions.
 August 29 – Hurricane Katrina makes landfall along the U.S. Gulf Coast, causing severe damage, killing over a thousand people and dealing an estimated $108 billion in damage.
 August 31 – A stampede at the Al-Aaimmah bridge in Baghdad, Iraq, kills 953 Shia Muslim pilgrims who were celebrating a religious festival.

September
 September 7 – Egypt holds its first ever multi-party presidential election, which is marred with allegations of fraud.
 September 12 – Israel demolishes multiple settlements and withdraws its army from the Gaza Strip.
 September 19 – North Korea agrees to stop building nuclear weapons in exchange for aid and cooperation.
 September 30 – Controversial drawings of Muhammad are printed in the Danish newspaper Jyllands-Posten, sparking outrage and violent riots by Muslims around the world.

October
 October 3 – The second solar eclipse of 2005 was an annular event, occurring at descending node in Virgo. This was 4.8 days after the Moon reached apogee. Gamma had a value of 0.33058. An annular solar eclipse was visible in Portugal, Spain, Libya, Sudan and Kenya, and was the 43rd solar eclipse of Solar Saros 134.
 October 8 – The 7.6  Kashmir earthquake strikes Azad Kashmir, Pakistan and nearby areas with a maximum Mercalli intensity of VIII (Severe), killing more than 86,000 people and displacing several million more.
 October 12 – The second crewed Chinese spacecraft, Shenzhou 6, is launched.
 October 17 – The final eclipse of 2005 was a partial lunar eclipse event, occurring at ascending node in Aries. This was 2.9 days after the Moon reached perigee. Gamma had a value of 0.97960. A partial lunar eclipse was visible in Asia, Australia, Pacific and North America, and was the 10th lunar eclipse of Lunar Saros 146.
 October 19 – The trial of Saddam Hussein begins.
October 24 – Hurricane Wilma makes landfall near Cape Romano.

November
 November 9 – At least 60 people are killed and 115 more are wounded in a series of coordinated suicide bombings in Amman, Jordan.
 November 11 – In Kazakhstan, Zamanbek Nurkadilov, former mayor of Almaty, government minister and a political opponent of Nursultan Nazarbayev is found dead at his family compound.
 November 13 – Andrew Stimpson, a 25-year-old Scottish man, is reported as the first person proven to have been 'cured' of HIV.
 November 22 
Angela Merkel assumes office as the first female Chancellor of Germany.
Microsoft releases the Xbox 360.
 November 23 – Ellen Johnson Sirleaf wins the Liberian general election, making her the first democratically elected female head of state in Africa.
 November 28 – The United Nations Climate Change conference is held in Montreal.
 November 30 – Surgeons in France carry out the first human face transplant with Isabelle Dinoire becoming the first person to undergo it.

December
 December 12 – Scientists announce that they have created mice with small numbers of human neurons in an effort to make realistic models of neurological disorders.
 December 16 – Find-a-drug medical distributed computing project is concluded.
 December 18 – Chad descends into civil war after various rebel forces, with support from Sudan, attack the capital, N'Djamena.
 December 25 – An express train bound for the city of Niigata, Niigata Prefecture, Japan, is derailed by strong winds in Shonai, Yamagata Prefecture. Five people are killed and at least 33 injured.
 December 31 – Another second is added, 23:59:60, to end the year 2005, the first time since 1998.

Births and Deaths

Nobel Prizes

 Chemistry – Robert Grubbs, Richard Schrock, and Yves Chauvin
 Economics – Robert J. Aumann, and Thomas Schelling
 Literature – Harold Pinter
 Peace – Mohamed ElBaradei
 Physics – Roy J. Glauber, John L. Hall, and Theodor W. Hänsch
 Physiology or Medicine – Robin Warren, and Barry Marshall

New English words and terms
didymo
functional calculus
glamping
locavore
microblogging
pre-exposure prophylaxis
ransomware
rock snot
sexting
truther
vodcast

References

Sources

External links